Dasht-e Kalusi (also Romanized as Dasht-e Kālūsī) is a village in Mahur Rural District, Mahvarmilani District, Mamasani County, Fars Province, Iran. At the 2006 census, its population was 15, in 5 families.

References 

Populated places in Mamasani County